Nuevo Paysandú is a northern suburb of Paysandú in the Paysandú Department of western Uruguay.

Geography
It is situated on the coast of Uruguay River, just south of the stream Arroyo de San Francisco Grande and west of Route 3.

At its west end is situated the Area Industrial F1 Norte of Paysandú, as well as General Artigas Bridge, which passes over Río Uruguay to join National Road #135 of Entre Ríos Province, Argentina.

Population
In 2011 Nuevo Paysandú had a population of 8,578. 
 
Source: Instituto Nacional de Estadística de Uruguay

References

External links
INE map of Nuevo Paysandú

Populated places in the Paysandú Department